Hans Zdražila (born 3 October 1941) is a retired Czechoslovak weightlifter who won a gold medal at the 1964 Summer Olympics setting a world record in the 75 kg weight category. By the next Games he moved to the heavier 82.5 kg division and finished sixth. At the world championships he won two bronze medals, in 1963 and 1966.

References

External links

 

1941 births
Living people
Czech male weightlifters
Czechoslovak male weightlifters
Olympic weightlifters of Czechoslovakia
Olympic gold medalists for Czechoslovakia
Olympic medalists in weightlifting
Weightlifters at the 1964 Summer Olympics
Weightlifters at the 1968 Summer Olympics
Medalists at the 1964 Summer Olympics
Sportspeople from Ostrava